Mount Marquis is a mountain in the southern part of the Du Toit Mountains, situated  north of Maury Glacier,  south-southwest of Dietz Bluff and  due west of the north end of Pullen Island, on the Black Coast of Palmer Land, Antarctica. It was mapped by the United States Geological Survey (USGS) from U.S. Navy aerial photographs, 1966–69, and was named by the Advisory Committee on Antarctic Names after Peter T. Marquis, a general assistant with the British Antarctic Survey (BAS), and a member of the joint BAS–USGS party to this area, 1986–87.

References

Mountains of Palmer Land